Os Dias Com Ele is a 2013 Brazilian documentary film directed by Maria Clara Escobar about her father Carlos Henrique Escobar, who is a philosopher, teacher and playwright that has a history marked by repression suffered during the military dictatorship.

References

External links
 

2013 documentary films
2013 films
Brazilian documentary films
Brazilian drama films
Brazilian biographical films
Films about Brazilian military dictatorship
Documentary films about Latin American military dictatorships
2010s Portuguese-language films